Lepetella is a genus of very small deep-sea sea snails or limpets, marine gastropod mollusks in the family Lepetellidae.

Description
The small shell is smooth, oval or oblong, limpet-shaped or conical. It has a simple sub-central apex that isn't spiral. The animal resembles Lepeta Gray, 1847, but has distinct eyes. It has a taenioglossan radula with seven regular rows of teeth.

Species
Species within the genus Lepetella include:
 Lepetella barrajoni Dantart & Luque, 1994
 Lepetella clypidellaeformis (Suter, 1908) 
 Lepetella espinosae Dantart & Luque, 1994
 Lepetella ionica F. Nordsieck, 1973
 Lepetella laterocompressa (de Rayneval & Ponzi, 1854)
 † Lepetella parallela (Laws, 1950) 
 Lepetella postapicula Dell, 1990
 Lepetella sierrai Dantart & Luque, 1994
 Lepetella tubicola Verrill & Smith, 1880

References

 Gofas, S.; Le Renard, J.; Bouchet, P. (2001). Mollusca, in: Costello, M.J. et al. (Ed.) (2001). European register of marine species: a check-list of the marine species in Europe and a bibliography of guides to their identification. Collection Patrimoines Naturels, 50: pp. 180–213 
 Dantart L. & Luque A. A. (1994). Cocculiniformia and Lepetidae (Gastropoda: Archaeogastropoda) from Iberian waters. Journal of Molluscan Studies 60 (3): 277-313 
Vaught, K.C. (1989). A classification of the living Mollusca. American Malacologists: Melbourne, FL (USA). . XII, 195 pp

External links
  Serge GOFAS, Ángel A. LUQUE, Joan Daniel OLIVER,José TEMPLADO & Alberto SERRA (2021) - The Mollusca of Galicia Bank (NE Atlantic Ocean); European Journal of Taxonomy 785: 1–114

Lepetellidae
Taxa named by Addison Emery Verrill
Gastropod genera